Connacht Rugby and Ulster Rugby are two Irish rugby union provincial teams that possess a rivalry that dates back to their IRFU Interprovincial Championship clashes during the amateur era. That rivalry has continued during the professional era and intensified as Connacht have more competitive in the domestic league, winning 2015-16 Pro12 championship. Connacht and Ulster comprise two of the four Irish provincial teams competing in the United Rugby Championship (formerly known as the Celtic League). As such, the two sides regularly face each other during the regular season. Typically, Ulster have had the advantage in the series with Connacht failing to achieve a single victory over Ulster between 1965 and 1982. Following Connacht's victory in 1983, it would not be until the 1997–98 season until they would achieve their next victory over Ulster. Connacht also went 58 years without winning a match in Belfast.

Below are the historical results of the Irish Rugby Football Union teams, Ulster and Connacht, as part of the IRFU Interprovincial Championship, and later the Celtic League, Pro12, Pro14, and United Rugby Championship.

Overall Summary of Games Since 1946

Statistics

Highest scoring match

2013–14: 70 points (Ulster 58 Connacht 12)

Lowest scoring match

1965–66: 6 points (Ulster 3 Connacht 3)

Highest margin of victory

Ulster: 46 points (58–12 in 2013–14)

Connacht: 28 points (44–16 at home in 2017–18)

Most consecutive wins

Ulster: 13 (1966–1979)

Connacht: 3 (1954–1957, 2017–2019)

Amateur Era Results 1946–1995

Professional Era Results since 1995/96 season

See also
 History of rugby union matches between Leinster and Munster
 History of rugby union matches between Leinster and Ulster
 History of rugby union matches between Leinster and Connacht
 History of rugby union matches between Munster and Connacht
 History of rugby union matches between Munster and Ulster
 IRFU Interprovincial Championship

References

Ulster
Connacht
Rugby union rivalries in Ireland
United Rugby Championship